Roberto Rodríguez may refer to:

Roberto Rodríguez (director) (1909–1995), Mexican film director
Bobby Rodríguez (bassist), bassist on Afro
Roberto Juan Rodríguez, Cuban-born American jazz and Klezmer-fusion percussionist
Roberto Rodríguez (baseball) (1941–2012), Venezuelan former pitcher in Major League Baseball
Roberto Rodríguez (football manager), Mexican former manager of Club América
Roberto Rodríguez (volleyball) (born 1986), beach volleyball player from Puerto Rico
Roberto Rodríguez (water polo) (born 1951), Cuban Olympic water polo player
Roberto Rodríguez (footballer), Swiss footballer

See also
Robert Rodriguez (born 1968), American film director
Robert Rodríguez (boxer) (born 1990), Mexican American boxer
Robert Rodriguez (gridiron football) (born 1981), El Paso coach